Freughlough is a townland in County Tyrone, Northern Ireland. It is situated in the historic barony of Omagh West and the civil parish of Urney and covers an area of 592 acres. 

The population of the townland declined during the 19th century:

The townland contains one Scheduled Historic Monument: a Standing stone (grid ref: H2620 8530) now situated on the edge of a housing estate. The stone stands to a height of 1.45m and a width of 1.05m.

See also
List of townlands of County Tyrone
List of archaeological sites in County Tyrone

References

Townlands of County Tyrone
Archaeological sites in County Tyrone
Barony of Omagh West